Deperetella is an extinct genus of herbivorous mammals that flourished in the Eocene and were related to tapirs. The genus was defined in 1925 by W. D. Matthew and Walter W. Granger, who named it after French paleontologist Charles Depéret.

References

Eocene odd-toed ungulates
Eocene mammals of Asia
Fossil taxa described in 1925